Ondassyn Seiluly Urazalin (Oñdasyn Seiılūly Orazalin; born 6 November 1963) is a Kazakh politician and is the current Äkim of Aktobe Region. He served as Deputy Chief of Staff of the Presidential Executive Office of Kazakhstan from 2017 to 2019).

Biography

Ondassyn Urazalin graduated from Aktobe pedagogical institute with the diploma of “teacher of English language” in 1985. 
In 1991 he graduated from Kazakh State University named after Al-Farabi with law major.

Career 
Teacher of Aktobe Pedagogical Institute (1985-1988);
Secretary of Komsomol of Aktobe Pedagogical Institute (1988-1990);
Head of the advertisement department of information agency of LPP “Rika-TV” (1990-1993); 
Chairman of the Executive Board of "Bank-Rika" (1993-1999);
Chairman of the Executive Board of CJC “Obltransgaz”, CJC “Aktobegaz” (1999-2000).
Akim of Mugalzhar district of Aktobe Region (2000-2003);
Head of Aktobe Region department of foreign trade communications and investments (2003-2004);
Director of the department of internal policy of Aktobe Region (09.2004-09.2005);
Deputy Governor of Aktobe Region (09.2005-11.2006);
In 2006 he started working for the Presidential Executive Office of Kazakhstan as State Inspector. Later he had been promoted to Deputy Head Department of State Control and Organization-Territorial Work (2007-2014);
Head of the Department of State Control and Organization-Territorial Work of the Presidential Executive Office of Kazakhstan (05.2014-22.03.2017);
Deputy Chief of Staff of the Presidential Executive Office of Kazakhstan (22.03.2017-25.02.2019);
Governor of Aktobe Region (26.02.2019-31.08.2022).

Awards 
The Order of Kurmet (2008)
The Order of Parasat (2014)

References

1963 births
Living people
Nur Otan politicians
People from Aktobe
Recipients of the Order of Kurmet
Recipients of the Order of Parasat